Igor Cașu (born October 8, 1973 in Borogani) is a historian from the Republic of Moldova.

Biography 

Igor Cașu was born on October 8, 1973 in Borogani, district Comrat, now in Leova. He studied history for 3 years at State University of Moldova and then transferred to University of Iași where he graduated with an MA in History in 1995 and subsequently defended his PhD at the same university – University of Iași - in 2000. The subject of his Ph.D. was Soviet Nationalities Politicy in Moldavia, 1944–1989.

In 2000 fall semester he was Fulbright Scholar-in-Residence at Lenoir-Rhyne College in Hickory, North Carolina, teaching a course on Balkan History and Politics in the 20th Century.

He contributed in 2006 to the Presidential Commission for the Study of the Communist Dictatorship in Romania as expert on former Moldavian SSR.

Igor Cașu has been also deputy Chair of the Commission for the analysis of the totalitarian communist regime in the Republic of Moldova, designated by Presidential Decree signed by the Acting President of Moldova, Mihai Ghimpu.

Since October 2010 he is (founding) Director  of the Center for the Study of Totalitarianism at the Faculty of History and Philosophy, State University of Moldova in Chişinău. He contributed for Radio Free Europe (2010–2011), Romanian language section (http://www.europalibera.org/author/20709.html) as well as to Romanian daily Adevărul (2010-2014), Chişinău edition (http://adevarul.ro/blogs/igor.casu).

Works 
The following is a list of works that were published: 
 Foametea din anii 1946-1947 din RSS Moldovenească: cauze şi consecinţe/The Mass Famine in the Moldavian SSR, 1946-1947: causes and consequences—accessibile at https://www.academia.edu/7785239/Foametea_din_anii_1946-1947_din_RSS_Moldoveneasca_cauze_si_consecinte_The_Mass_Famine_in_the_Moldavian_SSR_1946-1947_causes_and_consequences
 "Marea Teroare" in RASS Moldovenească, 1937-1938 (context intern și extern; operațiunile "culăcească" și "română"; represiuni față de nomenclatură; probe ale folosirii torturii/violenței)—accessibile at https://www.academia.edu/7973252/_Marea_Teroare_in_RASS_Moldoveneasca_1937-1938_context_intern_%C8%99i_extern_opera%C8%9Biunile_culaceasca_%C8%99i_romana_represiuni_fa%C8%9Ba_de_nomenclatura_probe_ale_folosirii_torturii_violen%C8%9Bei_
 Голод в Молдавской ССР 1946-1947 гг.: причины и последствия (https://usm-md.academia.edu/IgorCasu)
 Большой Террор в Молдавской АССР, 1937-1938 гг. ("кулацкая" и "румынская" операции, репрессии против номенклатуры и доказательства использования насилия) (https://usm-md.academia.edu/IgorCasu)
 Conflicte între Ministerul de Interne (MVD) şi Securitatea Statului (MGB) în ajunul şi în timpul deportării în masă din iulie 1949 din RSS Moldovenească (https://usm-md.academia.edu/IgorCasu)
 Конфликты между МВД и МГБ накануне и во время массовой депортации из Молдавской ССР (июль 1949 г.) (https://usm-md.academia.edu/IgorCasu)
 У истоков советизации Бессарабии. Выявление "классового врага", конфискация имущества и трудовая мобилизация, 1940-1941. Сборник документов [At the Origins of Sovietization of Bessarabia. Identification of "class enemy", confiscation of property and work mobilization, 1940–1941. Collections of documents from party, government and NKVD/KGB archives], Chişinău, Cartier, 2014, 458 p.  List of documents in Russian, Romanian and English, introduction in Russian and Romanian as well as short summary in English available at: https://www.academia.edu/7393697/_._1940-1941._
 Duşmanul de clasă. Represiuni politice, violenţă şi rezistenţă în R(A)SS Moldovenească, 1924-1956 [Class Enemy. Political Repressions, Violence and Resistance in Moldavian (A)SSR], Chişinău, Cartier, 2014, 396 p.  A summary in English available at: https://www.academia.edu/616126/Class_Enemy._Political_Repressions_Violence_and_Resistance_in_Moldavian_A_SSR_1924-1956_Chisinau_Cartier_2014_396_p._Summary_in_English_in_Romanian_Russian_version_to_be_ready_soon_
 Discontent and Uncertainty in theBorderlands: Soviet Moldavia and the SecretSpeech 1956–1957, in Europe-Asia Studies, 66:4, 2014, p. 613-644, co-author Mark Sandle. A summary in English available at: https://www.academia.edu/6931057/Discontent_and_Uncertainty_in_the_Borderlands_Soviet_Moldavia_and_the_Secret_Speech_1956-1957
 "World History and History of Romanians". History textbook for the 12th grade, recommended by the Ministry of Education of the Republic of Moldova, Chişinău, Cartier, 2013, 144 pages (co-author with Igor Şarov, Virgil Pâslariuc, Flavius Solomon and Pavel Cerbuşcă).
 "Political Repressions in Moldavian SSR after 1956: Towards a Typology Based on KGB files", in Dystopia. Journal of Totalitarian Ideologies and Regimes, vol. 1–2, 2012, p. 89-127. Full text available at: https://www.academia.edu/4921186/Political_Repressions_in_Moldavian_SSR_after_1956_Towards_a_Typology_Based_on_KGB_files
 "Was the Soviet Union an Empire? A view from Chisinau", in Dystopia. Journal of Totalitarian Ideologies and Regimes, vol. 1–2, 2012, p. 277-290. Full text available at: https://www.academia.edu/1055280/Was_the_Soviet_Union_an_Empire_A_view_from_Chisinau
 Fără termen de prescripţie. Aspecte ale crimelor comunismului în Europa [No Statute of Limitations. Aspects of the Communist Crimes in Europe], Chişinău, Cartier, 2011 (co-editor with Sergiu Musteaţă), 780 p. 
 Republica Moldova de la Perestroikă la independenţă, 1989-1991. Documente secrete din arhiva CC a PCM [The Republic of Moldova from Perestroika to independence, 1989–1991. Secret Documents from the Archive of the CC of PCM], introduction and titles of documents in Romanian, Russian and English, Chişinău, Cartdidact, 2011, 692 p. (main co-editor, with Igor Şarov). Full text available online at: https://www.academia.edu/4183904/Republica_Moldova_de_la_Perestroika_la_independenta_1989_1991._Documente_inedite_2011_-_Moldova_from_Perestroika_to_Independence_1989-1991._Secret_documents_2011._In_original_Russian_with_contents_and_introduction_in_Romanian_English_and_Russian
 Al Doilea Război Mondial în Estul şi Vestul Europei. Istorie şi memorie [Second World War in Eastern and Western Europe. History and Memory], Chişinău, Cartier, 2013, 332 p. (co-editor with Diana Dumitru, Andrei Cuşco and Petru Negură).
 "Был ли Советский Союз империей? Взгляд из Кишинева" // НЕПРИКОСНОВЕННЫЙ ЗАПАС (МОСКВА) No. 78 (4/2011). Full text available at: http://magazines.russ.ru/nz/2011/4/ka13.html
 "Stalinist Terror in Soviet Moldavia, 1940-1953", in Kevin McDermott, Matthew Stibbe, eds., Stalinist Terror in Eastern Europe. Elite purges and mass repression, Manchester and New York: Manchester University Press, 2010, p. 39-56.
 "Chestiunea revizuirii hotarelor RSS Moldoveneşti: de la proiectul "Moldova Mare" la proiectul "Basarabia Mare" şi cauzele eşecului acestora (decembrie 1943 – iunie 1946)" [ Moldavian SSR's Border Revision Question: From The Project of "Greater Moldavia" to The Project of "Greater Bessarabia" and The Causes of their Failure(December 1943 – June 1946)]. Documents in original Russian, translated in Romanian, with Introduction article of 22 pages, English summary of 2 pages, co-edited with Virgil Pâslariuc, in Archiva Moldaviae, no. 2, 2010, p. 275-370. Full text available online at: https://www.academia.edu/5465961/Chestiunea_revizuirii_hotarelor_RSS_Moldovenesti_de_la_proiectul_Moldova_Mare_la_proiectul_Basarabia_Mare_si_cauzele_esecului_acestora_decembrie_1943_-_iunie_1946_
 "Represiunile comuniste în Moldova Sovietică", în Vladimir Tismăneanu, Dorin Dobrincu, Vasile Cristian, eds., "Raportul Comisiei Prezidenţiale pentru analiza dictaturii comuniste din România", București, Humanitas publishing house, 2007.
 "Le Goulag Bessarabien: Deportations, Repressions, Famine, 1940-1941, 1944-1953", in Communisme (Paris), no. 91–92, 2007, p. 129-138. Full text available at: https://www.academia.edu/3049764/Le_Goulag_Bessarabien_Deportations_Repressions_Famine_1940-1941_1944-1953
 "Politica naţională" în Moldova Sovietică, 1944–1989 [Nationalities Policy in Soviet Moldavia, 1944-1989], Chişinău, Editura Cartdidact, 2000, 214 p. Summary in English and Russian. Full text available at: https://www.academia.edu/377397/Nationalities_Policy_in_Soviet_Moldavia_1944-1989
 Istoria Universală Contemporană, clasa a 9-a, Chişinău, Civitas, 2005.
 "Zur Binnendeportation von sowjetischen Deutschen und Juden im und nach dem Zweiten Weltkrieg", in Krista Zach et al.(eds.), Migration im sudostlichen Mitteleuropa. Auswanderung, Flucht, Deportation, Exil im 20. Jahrhundert, IKGS Verlag, Munchen, 2005
 Politică, societate şi cultură în sud-estul şi vestul Europei (mastercourse), Chişinau, TACIS, 2001.
 "Nation Building in the Era of Integration: The case of Moldova", in Konrad Jarausch and Thomas Lindenberger (eds.), Conflicting Memories: Europeanizing Contemporary History'', Oxford, Berghan Books, 2007, p. 237-253

Footnotes

External links 
 Preşedintele interimar al Republicii Moldova Mihai Ghimpu a emis un decret prezidenţial privind constituirea Comisiei pentru studierea şi aprecierea regimului comunist totalitar din Republica Moldova.
 Lavinia Stan. Review of Cașu, Igor, Dușmanul de clasă: Represiuni politice, violenţă şi rezistenţă în R(A)SS Moldovenească, 1924-1956. H-Romania, H-Net Reviews. September, 2014.

1973 births
Living people
21st-century Moldovan historians
Alexandru Ioan Cuza University alumni
Members of the Commission for the Study of the Communist Dictatorship in Moldova